Kinross Junction railway station served the burgh of Kinross, Perth and Kinross, Scotland from 1860 to 1970 on the Fife and Kinross Railway.

History 
The first station opened as Kinross on 20 August 1858 by the North British Railway. It closed in 1860 but a second station opened in the same year as Hopefield. It was renamed Kinross Junction on 1 October 1871 when the Devon Valley Railway opened. It was closed and resited 200 yards north in 1890. The signal box was to the south. It replaced the north signal box, which was burned down in the 1890s. The station closed on 5 January 1970.

References

External links
RAILSCOT - Kinross Junction (1st)
RAILSCOT - Kinross Junction (2nd)

Disused railway stations in Perth and Kinross
Former North British Railway stations
Railway stations in Great Britain opened in 1860
Railway stations in Great Britain closed in 1970
1860 establishments in Scotland
1970 disestablishments in Scotland